98th Brigade may refer to any of a number of  military divisions:
 98th Composite Brigade (Bangladesh)
 98th Indian Infantry Brigade
 98th Air Brigade (Serbia)
 98th Mixed Brigade (Spain)
 98th Brigade (United Kingdom)